The Europe Female was an event on the 2012 Vintage Yachting Games program at Lake Como,  Italy. Five out of the nine scheduled race were scheduled. 11 sailors, on 11 boats, from 4 nations entered. The event was started together with the Europe Male event. However separate scores were given.

Venue overview

Race area and Course
Of the three Campo's (Race Area's) available for the 2012 Vintage Yachting Games at Lake Como Campo Bravo was used for the Europe Female event. In general this Campo is situated in front of the city of Dervio.

For the 2012 edition of the Vintage Yachting Games three different courses were available. The Europe Female could only use course 3.

Wind conditions 
The Northern part of Lake Como was reportedly a thermic wind venue. In this time of year the normal situation is that at about 13:00 the Swiss mountains are heated up and a Southern wind hits the racing areas with about 10 to 14 knots. As result of this no races were scheduled in the morning. Unfortunately during the event the temperature in Switzerland was low during the Vintage. Also was the thermal South breeze battling with the gradient wind from the North. As result the actual wind did not came above the 8 knots during the races and was instable at times.

Campo Bravo has normally a tendency to have a slightly higher wind speed than the two other Campo's this due to the fact that it is more Northern than Charlie so that the Southern thermal breeze is strengthened and that the fact that the lake narrows in  front of Dervio.

Races

Summary 
In the Europe Female at Campo Bravo only five races could be completed.
In the Europe class, Olympic from 1992 – 2004, the female and male event started as one fleet in this Vintage. Of cause they had separate results.

By the female participants, Janika PULS, Germany, got a lead of 8 points over her opponent Anne-Line LYBGSØ THOMSEN from Denmark. Anna LIVBJERG also from Denmark took bronze. The fourth race was decisive.

Results 

 dnc = did not compete
 dns = did not start
 dnf = did not finish
 dsq = disqualified
 ocs = on course side
 ret = retired after finish
 Crossed out results did not count for the total result.

Daily standings

Victors

Notes

References 
 

Europe Female